Burt James Totaro, FRS (b. 1967), is an American mathematician, currently a professor at the University of California, Los Angeles, specializing in algebraic geometry and algebraic topology.

Education and early life 
Totaro participated in the Study of Mathematically Precocious Youth while in grade school and enrolled at Princeton University at the age of thirteen, becoming the youngest freshman in its history. He scored a perfect 800 on the math portion and a 690 on the verbal portion of the SAT-I exam at the age of 12. He graduated in 1984 and went on to graduate school at the University of California, Berkeley, receiving his Ph.D. in 1989.

Career and research
Since 2009, he has been one of three managing editors of the journal Compositio Mathematica; he is also on the editorial boards of  Forum of Mathematics, Pi and Sigma, the Journal of the American Mathematical Society, and the Bulletin of the American Mathematical Society.  In 2012, he became a Professor in the UCLA Department of Mathematics.

Totaro's work is influenced by the Hodge conjecture, and is based on the connections and application of topology to algebraic geometry.  His work has applications in a number of diverse areas of mathematics, from representation theory to Lie theory and group cohomology.

Selected works

Recognition
In 2000, he was elected Lowndean Professor of Astronomy and Geometry at the University of Cambridge. In the same year, he was awarded the Whitehead Prize by the London Mathematical Society.

In 2009, Totaro was elected Fellow of the Royal Society. He was included in the 2019 class of fellows of the American Mathematical Society "for contributions to algebraic geometry, Lie theory and cohomology and their connections and for service to the profession".

References 

20th-century American mathematicians
21st-century American mathematicians
Algebraic geometers
Fellows of the Royal Society
Fellows of the American Mathematical Society
Whitehead Prize winners
University of California, Los Angeles faculty
Cambridge mathematicians
Lowndean Professors of Astronomy and Geometry
Princeton University alumni
University of California, Berkeley alumni
Living people
1967 births
Topologists